José Ricardo Avelar Ribeiro (born 4 September 1998), commonly known as Zé Ricardo, is a Brazilian footballer who plays as a defender for Spanish club CD Lugo.

Club career
A Rayo Vallecano youth graduate, Zé Ricardo made his senior debut with Portuguese side SC Mirandela in the Campeonato de Portugal. In 2019, he moved to Liga Portugal 2 side Feirense.

On 7 July 2022, Zé Ricardo returned to Spain after signing a two-year deal with Segunda División side CD Lugo.

Career statistics

Club

References

1998 births
Living people
Brazilian footballers
Spanish footballers
Brazilian emigrants to Spain
Association football defenders
Liga Portugal 2 players
Campeonato de Portugal (league) players
Rayo Vallecano players
SC Mirandela players
C.D. Feirense players
CD Lugo players
Brazilian expatriate sportspeople in Portugal
Expatriate footballers in Portugal
Sportspeople from Goiânia